Robert Henry Kohrs (born November 8, 1958) is a former American football player. Kohrs played as defensive back and linebacker in the NFL for the Pittsburgh Steelers. He was a 2nd round draft pick in the 1980 NFL Draft out of Arizona State University.

Football career
Kohrs was born and raised in Phoenix. He had an outstanding high school career at Brophy College Preparatory and was recruited to play for the Sun Devils in 1976. With Arizona State Kohrs racked up 214 tackles and 30 quarterback sacks. In 1977, he helped the Sun Devils clinch a half-share of the WAC title and berth in the Fiesta Bowl. The next season, in a game against new Pac-10 rival USC, then ranked second in the nation, Kohrs racked up six tackles, including a sack, three fumble recoveries, and three pass deflections, earning himself "Player of the week" honors from Sports Illustrated magazine. Later in the 1978 campaign, Kohrs had 15 tackles in a game against Arizona. Kohrs made first-team All-Pac-10 in 1979. He was drafted in the 2nd round of the 1980 NFL Draft by the Pittsburgh Steelers. He played five seasons in the NFL before retiring after the 1985 season.

References
Bob Kohrs, Pro football reference
Sun Devil football history, Bob Kohrs
Bob Kohrs, NFL database

Arizona State Sun Devils football players
Pittsburgh Steelers players
1958 births
Living people
Players of American football from Phoenix, Arizona